Provincial Highway 78 begins in Taixi, Yunlin, Taiwan, on Zhonghua Road (Provincial Highway No. 17) and ends in Gukeng, Yunlin on National Highway No. 3.

Length
The total length is 42.879 km.

Exit List
The entire route is within Yunlin County.

{| class="plainrowheaders wikitable"
|-
!scope=col|City
!scope=col|Location
!scope=col|km
!scope=col|Mile
!scope=col|Exit
!scope=col|Name
!scope=col|Destinations
!scope=col|Notes
|-

Major Cities Along the Route
Douliu City

Intersections with other Freeways and Expressways
National Highway No. 1 at Yunlin JCT. in Dapi, Yunlin
National Highway No. 3 at Gukeng JCT. in Gukeng, Yunlin
Provincial Highway No. 61 at Taixi IC. in Taixi, Yunlin

See also
 Highway system in Taiwan

Notes
Completed in December 2004.

References

External links
thb.gov.tw

Highways in Taiwan